is a 2016 Japanese animated wartime drama film produced by MAPPA, co-written and directed by Sunao Katabuchi, featuring character designs by Hidenori Matsubara and music by Kotringo. The film is based on the manga of the same name written and illustrated by Fumiyo Kōno. It premiered in Japan on November 12, 2016. Animatsu Entertainment licensed the global distribution rights of the film in June 2016. Shout! Factory acquired the distribution rights for North America, with a U.S. theatrical release on August 11, 2017, co-released by Funimation Films. An extended version of the film, titled , premiered on December 20, 2019 and surpassed the extended 70mm cut of Final Yamato by five minutes to become the longest animated film to date.

The film is set in the 1930s–1940s in Hiroshima and Kure in Japan, roughly 10 years before and after the atomic bombing of Hiroshima, but mainly in 1944–45. In the film, nature and traditional culture in Japan are clearly described and contrasted with the cruel and irredeemable scenes brought by the war. Though it is a fictional account, the official guidebook of the film claims that the episodes and background of the story are based on facts and real incidents of the lost townscape of pre-war Hiroshima damaged by the bombing, as researched by the production staff.

Plot
A cheerful and easily distracted woman named Suzu lives in a seaside town called Eba near Hiroshima. As a child, Suzu enjoys sketching and painting the world around her, often viewing her surroundings through a surrealistic blend of real scenery and art-inspired flourishes that permeate her vision. As her proficiency for art increases, Suzu paints a superb picture for her childhood friend and crush, Tetsu, as he stares at the sea and laments the death of his brother, who drowned during his service as a sailor. In 1943, 18-year-old Suzu marries Shusaku, whom she had met as a child, and joins his family in Kure, a large naval port city 15 miles away from Hiroshima City, as a navy civilian. As she adjusts to her new life, the threat of the Pacific War begins to encroach on the townspeople.

As food shortages become commonplace, the government implements food rationing. Warning and evacuation preparations against United States air raids begin. Suzu, as a housewife in a Tonarigumi, takes turns overseeing food distribution, attends training against air raids, and makes women's trousers fit for emergency evacuation by cutting traditional clothing, such as kimonos. The family builds the air-raid shelter in the garden.

Suzu and Shusaku's family house is located on a hillside with a view of the Japanese Naval Fleet in the harbor, including the largest battleships, Yamato and Musashi. Suzu enjoys viewing boats on the sea with her niece, Harumi.

Harumi and her mother Keiko had been living in another city. Keiko is an independent modern woman who had chosen her own husband who ran a watch shop. Keiko had met her husband in his shop when she went to get a watch. He died young leaving Keiko, Harumi and a son behind. Keiko's husband's family took over the family's watch business and Keiko left her husband's home leaving her son, the legal heir of her husband, behind.

One day, while sketching the bay area and some visiting ships, Suzu is accosted by the military police who come close to accusing her of espionage because of the potential militaristic nature of her drawings. Suzu is horrified, but her adopted family laughs off the incident, exclaiming at length that Suzu is too lackadaisical and good-natured for espionage.

In December 1944, Suzu's childhood friend and crush Tetsu, now a navy sailor, visits Suzu; he has been assigned to the Japanese cruiser Aoba, stationed in Kure. Understanding that it might be Suzu's last chance to see Tetsu alive, Shusaku leaves them alone to talk. Though he confessed his love for her, Suzu told him she loved her husband more than anything. The next spring, Shusaku is drafted by the Navy and quartered with troops in Otake City, 40 miles away.
 
In 1945, the U.S. begins air raids on the Japanese mainland; in Kure, U.S. naval airplanes heavily attack warships and its naval facilities. In addition to the death of her brother Yōichi, Suzu loses her niece and her right hand when a time-delayed bomb detonates close to them. The guilt Suzu feels over the death of her niece couple with the loss of the hand she used to draw and paint sends Suzu into a depression.
As her depression worsens, Suzu debates returning to the safety of her hometown in Hiroshima City in time for the summer festival; when she is unable to see a doctor, she decides to stay an extra week in Kure. That morning, Suzu and Keiko notice a bizarre light, followed by a sudden quake. The radio doesn't work and then the family sees a towering cloud in the direction of Hiroshima City. They soon learn that a new, devastating bomb has fallen on Hiroshima City, killing countless citizens. For a while, Suzu is unable to get information about her hometown.

A few days later, in a radio address, the Emperor of Japan announces the end of the War by declaring surrender to the Allied Powers. Suzu, having grown accustomed to the single-minded focus of keeping the family alive, is forced to accept the reality of her losses and falls into despair. U.S. occupation forces, no longer the enemy, come to Kure and provide food. Suzu visits her grandmother Ito's family house in Kusatsu, a rural town to the west of Hiroshima and out of the affected area, to see her sister Sumi, the only survivor of Suzu's family. Sumi informs her of the fate of their parents: their mother had left for supplies and is presumed to be one of the 70,000 people who were killed instantly by the initial blast and shock wave while their father died a few months later after falling ill and succumbing to possible radiation poisoning. Sumi herself has fallen seriously ill from the radiation left behind by the fallout. Shusaku returns and meets with Suzu. They come across an orphaned girl and adopt her. Suzu regains her passion for life slowly, with the courage and affection of her friends and family. As the credits roll, their adopted daughter is shown growing up in the Hojo residence, sewing clothes, aided by Suzu in post-war Japan.

Cast

Development

The project was announced in August 2012 and began crowdfunding in March 2015 to raise funds. The crowdfunding was a success, with a Japanese record of 3,374 contributors and the  raised exceeding the  goal.<ref>{{cite web|last1=Schilling|first1=Mark|title=Crowd-Funding Puts Japanese Anime Corners' Into Production|url=https://variety.com/2015/film/asia/crowd-funding-japanese-anime-corners-1201511302/|website=Variety|date=3 June 2015|access-date=31 May 2016|archive-date=28 June 2017|archive-url=https://web.archive.org/web/20170628160916/http://variety.com/2015/film/asia/crowd-funding-japanese-anime-corners-1201511302/|url-status=live}}</ref>
Another crowdfunding, to send Katabuchi overseas for promotion, was started on November 22, 2016 and reached the goal of  within eleven hours.

Director Sunao Katabuchi tried to add accurate details to the backgrounds of the film, such as one shot which took over 20 revisions to get right, using aerial photographs to estimate the size of a shop and interviewing over 10 elderly residents.

On July 25, 2018, the official Twitter account for the film announced that the film would receive an extended version titled . It was originally scheduled to be released theatrically in Japan in December 2018, but it was delayed to December 20, 2019. The extended version emphasizes the relationship between Rin, Shusaku and Suzu, containing about 40 minutes of additional of footage.

Reception

Box office

Critical response
On review aggregator site Rotten Tomatoes, In This Corner of the World has a 97% rating based on 73 reviews, with a rating average of 7.65/10. The website's critical consensus reads, "In This Corner of the World offers a unique ground-level perspective on an oft-dramatized period in history, further distinguished by beautiful hand-drawn animation." On Metacritic, the film has a weighted average score of 73 out of 100 based on 21 critics, indicating "generally favorable reviews." On AlloCiné, the film has an average score of 4.3/5 based on 21 critics, ranked in the 9th place among the films produced in 2016.

Sarah Ward of Screen International praised the film's visual aesthetic and screenplay as "involving and entrancing." In her review, Ward concludes: "[In This Corner of the World] is a beautiful, heart-swelling animated movie, to be certain, but it's also one that knows that such picturesque sights and pleasant sensations are only part of the equation." In a review for TheWrap, Dan Callahan found In This Corner of the World to be "beautiful but erratic", disapproving the screenplay but opining that the film "is bound to bring a smile to the face."

AccoladesIn This Corner of the World won the 40th Japan Academy Film Prize for Best Animated Film, the 90th Kinema Junpo Best 10 Award for Best Japanese Film as the second-ever animated film, and the Jury Award at the 41st Annecy International Animated Film Festival, and was nominated for the 45th Annie Award for Best Animated Feature-Independent.

Sunao Katabuchi won the Award of the Minister of Education, Culture, Sports, Science and Technology in Film Category at the 67th Art Encouragement Prize, the 59th Blue Ribbon Award for Best Director as the first-ever animated film director, and the 90th Kinema Junpo Best 10 Award for Best Japanese Film Director as the first-ever animated film director.

The 65th Kikuchi Kan Prize was awarded to the team of In This Corner of the World'' including participants of the crowdfunding.

Notes

References

External links
  
  
 
 

2016 anime films
Animated drama films
Anime films based on manga
Crowdfunded films
Drama anime and manga
Films about amputees
Films about the atomic bombings of Hiroshima and Nagasaki
Films directed by Sunao Katabuchi
Films set in the 1930s
Films set in the 1940s
Films set in Hiroshima
Historical anime and manga
Japan Academy Prize for Animation of the Year winners
Japanese World War II films
MAPPA